The 2018–19 LBA season, also known as Serie A PosteMobile for sponsorship reasons, was the 97th season of the Lega Basket Serie A (LBA), the men's top tier professional basketball division of the Italian basketball league system (LBA). The regular season began on October 7, 2018 and finished on May 12, 2019, with the playoffs started on May 18 (dependent on an Italian club qualifying for the 2019 EuroLeague Final Four, 2019 EuroCup Playoffs or for the 2019 Champions League Playoffs) and finished on June 22.

As in previous years, Molten Corporation provided the official ball for all matches.

AX Armani Exchange Milano were the defending champions.

Umana Reyer Venezia won their 4th title by beating Banco di Sardegna Sassari in game 7 of the finals.

Teams

Promotion and relegation (pre-season)

A total of 16 teams contested the league, including 15 sides from the 2017–18 season and one promoted from the 2017–18 Serie A2.

Alma Pallacanestro Trieste was the promoted club from the Serie A2 Basket after beating Novipiù Casale Monferrato at game 3 of league's playoffs, and returned to the top division after a 14 years absence.

Trieste replaced Betaland Capo d'Orlando who were relegated during the previous season.

Number of teams by region

Notes
 2017–18 LBA champion.
 2017–18 Serie A2 champion.

Venues and locations

Personnel and sponsorship

Managerial changes

Changes from 2017–18
As in previous seasons, LBA clubs must play in arenas that seat at least 3,500 people. From 2017–18 season, all clubs must host their home playoffs matches in arenas with a seating capacity of at least 5,000 people.

Rules
Each team is allowed either five or seven foreign players under two formulas:
5 foreigners from countries outside the European Union
3 foreigners from countries outside the EU, 4 foreigners from EU countries (also including those from countries signatory of the Cotonou Agreement)

Each club can choose the 5+5 formula, that consists of five Italian players and five foreign players, and the 3+4+5 formula, with five Italian players, three foreigners from countries outside the EU and four foreigners from EU countries or "Cotonou Countries".

At the end of the season there will be a prize of €500.000,00 for the top three ranked teams, that had chosen the 5+5 formula, considering the playing time of Italian players, and €200.000,00 for those teams that will obtain the best results with their youth sector.

Regular season
In the regular season, teams played against each other home-and-away in a round-robin format. The eight first qualified teams advanced to the Playoffs, the last seven qualified teams were eliminated, while the last one qualified team was relegated and replaced by the winner of the playoffs of the second-level Serie A2 Basket. The matchdays were from October 7, 2018, to May 2019.

League table

Positions by round
The table lists the positions of teams after completion of each round. In order to preserve chronological evolvements, any postponed matches are not included in the round at which they were originally scheduled, but added to the full round they were played immediately afterwards. For example, if a match is scheduled for round 13, but then postponed and played between rounds 16 and 17, it will be added to the standings for round 16.
Updated to match(es) played on May 12, 2019. Source: LBA

Results

Notes
 AX Armani Exchange Milano won the game on the road 91-81, but OriOra Pistoia awarded 20-0 win over Milano due to playing James Nunnally while he was under suspension.
 Vanoli Cremona won the game on the road 105-100 after an overtime, but awarded 20-0 win over Banco di Sardegna Sassari due to coaching Gianmarco Pozzecco while he was under suspension.

Statistical leaders
As of May 12, 2019.

Points

Assists

Rebounds

Valuation

Other Statistics

Individual game highs

Source: RealGM

Awards

Finals MVP
 Austin Daye (Umana Reyer Venezia)

Most Valuable Player
 Drew Crawford (Vanoli Cremona)

Best Player Under 22
 Tony Carr (Red October Cantù)

Best Coach
 Romeo Sacchetti (Vanoli Cremona)

Best Executive
 Simone Giofré (New Basket Brindisi)

Round MVP

Playoffs

The LBA playoffs quarterfinals and semifinals were best of five formats, while the finals series were best of seven format. The playoffs began on May 18, 2019, and finished on June 22, 2019.

Final standings

Serie A clubs in European competitions

Supercup

The 2018 Italian Supercup, also known as Zurich Connect Supercoppa 2018 for sponsorship reasons, was the 24rd edition of the super cup tournament of the Italian basketball. The Supercup opened the 2018–19 season on 29 and 30 September 2018, and it was contested in the PalaLeonessa in Brescia.

Qualified for the tournament were Fiat Torino and Germani Brescia, as Italian Cup finalists, AX Armani Exchange Milano and Dolomiti Energia Trento as LBA Playoffs finalist.

AX Armani Exchange Milano beat the tournament host Germani Basket Brescia 59–81, while Fiat Torino beat Dolomiti Energia Trento 81–72.

AX Armani Exchange Milano was the Supercup winner for the third consecutive season after beating Fiat Torino in the final 82–71. Milano used an 11–0 run to start the second quarter and jump in front. Milano held a 41–31 lead at halftime, then Vladimir Micov nailed three triples early in the third quarter to open a 55–38 lead. Torino closed in with a 0–12 run in the fourth quarter, but Artūras Gudaitis had a three-point play to extend it to 76–67, and sending Milano on its way to victory. Micov and Gudaitis scored 17 points apiece to lead Milano to its first trophy of the season. Nemanja Nedović scored 14, and Mike James had 10 in a victory. Tony Carr paced Torino with 15 points, while Tekele Cotton, Tyshawn Taylor and Jamil Wilson scored 11 apiece.

Vladimir Micov was named MVP of the competition.

Cup

The 51st edition of the Italian Cup, knows as the PosteMobile Final Eight for sponsorship reasons, was contested in February 2019. As in the previous edition, Nelson Mandela Forum in Florence hosted the Cup. Eight teams qualified for the Final Eight were Avellino, Bologna, Brindisi, Cremona, Milano, Sassari, Varese and Venezia.

Fiat Torino were the defending champions.

Segafredo Virtus Bologna stunned AX Armani Exchange Milano 84-86 and Vanoli Cremona defeated Openjobmetis Varese 82–73 in the Italian Cup quarterfinals on Thursday. The game was not as close as the final score would indicate with Bologna leading by multiple possessions throughout the fourth quarter and Milano only getting within 2 on a Curtis Jerrells triple on the buzzer. Tony Taylor scored 23 points and Pietro Aradori 16 for Bologna, which took a big step towards adding to its record eight Italian Cup triumphs. James Nunnally paced Milano with 19 points while leading scorer Mike James shot just 1 for 11 on three-pointers and finished with 13 points. For Cremona, Drew Crawford scored 22 points and Wesley Saunders added 20.

On the second night of the Italian Cup quarterfinals, Banco di Sardegna Sassari edged Umana Reyer Venezia 88-89 behind 24 points from Dyshawn Pierre and New Basket Brindisi out-gunned Sidigas Avellino 95-98 as Adrian Banks poured in 26 points.

Vanoli Cremona will play New Basket Brindisi in the final of the Italian Cup. In the semifinals, Cremona topped Segafredo Virtus Bologna 102-91 as Travis Diener netted 26 points on 6-for-9 three-point shooting. Mangok Mathiang added 19 points and 10 rebounds in the victory. Brindisi held off Sassari 86–87, with John Brown scoring 20 points, and Jeremy Chappell collecting 18 points plus 9 rebounds.

Vanoli Cremona lifted the Italian Cup for the first time after beating New Basket Brindisi 83–74 in the final. Wesley Saunders posted 18 points and 9 rebounds and Drew Crawford also scored 18 to lead the winners. Michele Ruzzier added 12 points off the bench. Cremona used a 9-0 second-quarter run to surge ahead from a 25–25 tie and led 45–37 at halftime. The lead stood in double figures for most of the second half and Brindisi never got closer than 6. John Brown posted 21 points and 8 rebounds and Tony Gaffney scored 19 in defeat. Drew Crawford was named Panasonic MVP of the competition.

References

External links
 Lega Basket website 

Lega Basket Serie A seasons
Italian
2018–19 in Italian basketball